Poland–Ukraine relations revived on an international  basis soon after Ukraine gained independence from the Soviet Union in 1991. Various controversies from the shared history of the two countries' peoples occasionally resurface in Polish–Ukrainian relations, but they tend not to have a major influence on the bilateral relations of Poland and Ukraine.

Ukraine and Poland are respectively, the second- and third-largest Slavic countries, after Russia. Poland's 2003 acceptance of the 1985 Schengen Agreement created problems with Ukrainian border traffic. On July 1, 2009, an agreement on local border traffic between the two countries came into effect, which enables Ukrainian citizens living in border regions to cross the Polish frontier according to a liberalized procedure.

Ukraine is a member of the Eastern Partnership, a European Union project initiated by Poland in 2009, which aims to provide an avenue for discussions of trade, economic strategy, travel agreements, and other issues between the EU and its Eastern European neighbours.

Ukraine is the country with the largest number of Polish consulates. The two countries have a long shared history - some parts of western Ukraine (such as Lviv) formed part of the Polish state for several centuries and parts of eastern Poland once had large native Ukrainian populations; the demographics of the regions along the Polish-Ukrainian border were profoundly affected by the 1944 to 1946 population exchange between Poland and Soviet Ukraine and actions such as the 1947 Operation Vistula in the aftermath of World War II.
Poland supports Ukraine's European Union and NATO membership.

Comparison

History of relations

Polish–Ukrainian relations can be traced to the 16th-17th centuries in the Polish–Lithuanian Commonwealth and the often turbulent relations between that state and the mostly polonized nobility (szlachta) and the Cossacks. And even further into the 13th-14th centuries when the Kingdom of Poland and the Ruthenian Kingdom maintained close ties. Present day relations remain somewhat turbulent.

The next stage would be the relations in the years 1918–1920, in the aftermath of World War I, which saw both the Polish–Ukrainian War and the Polish-Ukrainian alliance. The interwar period would eventually see independent Poland while the Ukrainians had no state of their own, being divided between Poland and the Soviet Union. This situation led to a deterioration in Polish−Ukrainian relations, and it would result in a flare-up of ethnic tensions both during and immediately after World War II (with the massacres of Poles in Volhynia and Operation Vistula being the most infamous events). In the interbellum, Poland maintained two consulates in the Ukrainian Soviet Socialist Republic, located in Kharkiv and Kyiv. The staff of the latter was arrested by the Soviets in 1939 during the German-Soviet invasion of Poland which started World War II, with the fate of the Polish consul unknown to this day. Parts of the genocidal Soviet Polish Operation of 1937–1938 and the Katyn massacre of 1940 were both committed in the Ukrainian Soviet Socialist Republic by the NKVD.

While this left the Polish–Ukrainian relations in the mid-20th century in a relatively poor state, there was little meaningful and independent diplomacy and contact between the Polish People's Republic (Poland) and the Ukrainian Soviet Socialist Republic (Ukraine). The situation changed significantly with the fall of communism, when both Poland and Ukraine became fully independent and could once again decide on foreign policies of their own.

In the emigre community however, the very influential Paris-based magazine Kultura, which was smuggled into Poland and read widely, advocated for a rapprochement with Ukraine, Belarus, and Lithuania.

Modern era

1989–2004 
In September 1989, shortly after the democratic forces led by Solidarity came to power in Warsaw, a group of Polish parliamentarians arrived in Kyiv for the constituent congress of the People's Movement of Ukraine. They supported the aspirations of the national democratic forces of Ukraine. It was then that the foundations of a new model of Polish–Ukrainian relations were laid.

Progress in Polish–Ukrainian relations was evidenced by the decision of the Polish Senate of July 27, 1990 on the proclamation of Ukraine on July 16, 1990, the Declaration of State Sovereignty. This document, in particular, states: "Poles, who consider freedom and independence of the Fatherland as their core values, fully understand the turning point in the history of Ukraine—a neighbor with whom they want to live as equal and close peoples, as well as develop cooperation in everything."

On August 3, 1990, the Senate of the Republic of Poland adopted a special statement in which it gave a political and moral assessment of the Vistula action. The statement stated that “the communist authorities, having begun to liquidate units of the Ukrainian Insurgent Army, at the same time forcibly relocated persons, mainly of Ukrainian nationality. Within three months, about 150,000 people, deprived of their property, houses and shrines, were evicted from various places. For many years they were not allowed to return, and then it was difficult for them to return. The Senate of the Republic of Poland condemns the action "Vistula", typical of totalitarian regimes, and will try to compensate for the insults arising from it. "
On October 13, 1990 Poland and Ukraine agreed to the "Declaration on the foundations and general directions in the development of Polish–Ukrainian relations". Article 3 of this declaration said that neither country has any territorial claims against the other, and will not bring any in the future. Both countries promised to respect the rights of national minorities on their territories and to improve the situation of minorities in their countries.

Following the failed Soviet coup attempt, Ukraine declared independence on August 24, 1991. A day after the referendum on December 2, 1991, the Republic of Poland was the first foreign country to recognize Ukraine's state independence. Diplomatic relations were established between the two countries on January 8, 1992.

On May 18–19, 1992, the first official visit of the President of Ukraine Leonid Kravchuk to the Republic of Poland took place, during which an interstate Treaty on Good-Neighborliness, Friendly Relations and Cooperation was signed, in which it was stated that the countries structures based on the Final Act of the Conference on Security and Cooperation in Europe, the Paris Charter for a New Europe, "will take and support measures aimed at preserving and developing positive traditions of common heritage, as well as overcoming prejudices and negative stereotypes between the two nations.

On May 24–25, 1993, the President of Poland Lech Wałęsa paid an official visit to Ukraine, one of the main results of which was the establishment of the Advisory Committee of the Presidents of Ukraine and the Republic of Poland. In February of the same year, an agreement on military cooperation was signed between the Ministry of Defense of Ukraine and the Ministry of National Defense of Poland, which was supplemented in a number of protocols in the following years.

In March 1994, the Declaration of the Ministers of Foreign Affairs of Ukraine and Poland on the Principles of Ukrainian-Polish Partnership was signed, in which the Ministers of Foreign Affairs for the first time at the interstate level declared the strategic importance of Ukrainian-Polish relations and pledged to develop them in the future.

Poland has agreed to help Ukraine integrate into Western European organizations, primarily NATO and the EU. As Jerzy Kozakiewicz, the first Ambassador of the Republic of Poland to Ukraine, noted in early 1996, "one of the most important tasks of Polish foreign policy is to spread and strengthen various bilateral instruments in our bilateral relations with Ukraine that would facilitate its path to European institutions." The representative of the Ministry of Foreign Affairs of Ukraine figuratively defined the main direction of cooperation with Poland: "For Ukraine, the way through Moscow leads to Siberia, and through Warsaw, to Paris."

A further important step in creating an organizational infrastructure for bilateral dialogue was the interstate "Agreement between the Government of Ukraine and the Government of the Republic of Poland on Cooperation concerning the Protection and Return of Cultural Property Lost and Illegally Displaced during World War II" dated 25 June 1996, which defined and specified the subject and scope of mutual cooperation between the parties. In particular, article 2 of the Agreement declares: "In order to protect, preserve, search for, and return cultural property associated with the culture and history of the Parties, recognized as lost or illegally moved to the territory of the other Party, the Parties shall establish an Intergovernmental Ukrainian-Polish Commission [for the Protection and Return of Cultural Property Lost and Illegally Displaced during World War II]."

After the visits of Leonid Kuchma to Warsaw on June 25–27, 1996 and the newly elected President of Poland Aleksander Kwaśniewski to Kyiv on May 20–22, 1997, Ukrainian–Polish relations reached the level of a strategic partnership. On May 21, the two heads of state signed a joint informal Declaration of Harmony and Unity.

The purposeful development of Polish–Ukrainian political cooperation allowed Ukraine to enlist the support of Poland in establishing the first dialogue with the United States and the leading states of Europe. The National Security Strategy of Poland declares Warsaw's support for Ukraine's Euro-Atlantic aspirations, in particular, as part of the continuation of the "open door" policy to NATO. In addition, it is emphasized that Polish–Ukrainian cooperation should help consolidate Ukraine's important role in European security policy.

During the official visit of the Minister of Foreign Affairs Bronisław Geremek to Ukraine on September 15–16, 1998, the parties agreed to intensify joint actions in order to avoid possible negative consequences of EU enlargement. Bronisław Geremek also noted that his country will continue to support Ukraine's integration aspirations, in particular in gaining the status of an associate member of the EU. At the end of March 1999, the first meeting of the Ukrainian-Polish Conference on European Integration took place in Warsaw.

Although some Ukrainian officials, scholars and political scientists have expressed concern that Poland will turn away from Ukraine after it becomes a member of NATO, support for Ukraine's cooperation and rapprochement with NATO remains a characteristic feature of the Polish state's "Ukrainian policy." This is due to Poland's vision of its national interests in the context of the basic contours of European security and to the desire to play an important role in a renewed Alliance that adapts to modern conditions.

Poland supports Ukraine's European integration for similar reasons. An independent and strong, and most importantly, friendly, Ukraine is an important instrument of Polish Eastern European policy since it significantly counterbalances the Russian Federation's influence and ambition relative to Poland. Speaking in the Sejm of the Republic of Poland on March 5, 1998, B. Geremek had every reason to say that "independent Ukraine is of key strategic importance both for Poland and its security, and for stability in the entire region. Maintaining privileged relations with Ukraine contributes to strengthening European security."

2004–2014 
Support for Ukrainian sovereignty has become an important component of Polish foreign policy. Poland strongly supported the peaceful and democratic resolution of the 2004 Orange Revolution in Ukraine, and has backed NATO-Ukraine cooperation (such as the Lithuanian–Polish–Ukrainian Brigade), as well as Ukraine's efforts to join the European Union.

Poland's accession to the European Union has created a new reality for Ukraine. For the first time, a member country has lobbied for Ukraine's course towards EU, as well as NATO, membership. At the same time, in the conditions of post-orange development there was a need for significant modernization of the structure and filling of the political dialogue between Ukraine and Poland. For example, cooperation aimed at achieving Ukraine's compliance with the first of the Copenhagen criteria for EU membership ("political" criterion): ensuring the stability of democratic institutions, protection of human rights and the rule of law has become essential. 2005 was declared the Year of Ukraine in the Republic of Poland and inaugurated in Warsaw in April 2005 with the participation of President of Ukraine Viktor Yushchenko. Ukraine and Poland have signed agreements on academic recognition of documents on education and scientific degrees and on cooperation in the field of informatization. Trade, economic, scientific and technical ties between Ukraine and Poland have expanded. The Republic of Poland has become Ukraine's most important economic partner in Central Europe. Ukraine is the second largest country to which Polish exports went. As of 2008, the joint Ukrainian–Polish cooperation program in the field of science and technology included more than 150 joint research projects.

Cross-border cooperation has developed within the framework of the Karpaty and Bug Euroregions established in the mid-1990s. At the same time, almost all areas of bilateral relations faced problems related to Poland's entry into the Schengen Area from the end of 2007, which led to new procedures and rules for crossing the Ukrainian-Polish border and, accordingly, created additional difficulties for developing and optimizing cooperation between the two. states.

An important focus of the development of bilateral relations was Poland's initiation of the activation of the Eastern vector in EU policy. The idea of strengthening the eastern vector of the European Neighborhood Policy (ENP) became one of the priorities of Poland's foreign policy in 2008, which positioned itself as a leader in this direction. Polish Foreign Minister Radoslaw Sikorski, presenting the country's foreign policy for 2008 in the Sejm on May 7, 2008, declared the idea: "Poland should continue to specialize in developing a common foreign policy towards the East." At the same time, Poland has sought and continues to seek to strengthen its position in the EU, primarily by strengthening its role in Eastern Europe. Jan Kalicki, director of the Center for Eastern European Studies at the University of Warsaw, confirmed this idea in an interview with Polish Radio: "I want to emphasize that the strength of Poland's position in the European Union depends on the support and strength we have in the East." The Polish Foreign Minister stressed that his country intends to implement the ENP in the east with its partners—the Czech Republic, Slovakia, Hungary, Estonia, Lithuania, Latvia, Romania and Bulgaria, as well as with Sweden. At the European Council in March 2008, Poland supported the proposal to create a Union for the Mediterranean and thus counted on the support of the EU to separate the eastern direction of the ENP.

At the same time, these intentions of Poland were realized and reflected in the joint Polish-Swedish proposal "Eastern Partnership" of May 23, 2008. It was presented and approved at the meeting of the EU General Policy Council and the Council on Foreign Relations on May 26, 2008. in Brussels and has become the flagship initiative of the entire EU. On 26 May 2008, during a meeting of EU Foreign Ministers in Brussels, Poland and Sweden presented a joint proposal to deepen the EU's Eastern policy, known as the EU's Eastern Partnership (EU). The JV initiative is addressed to six countries: direct addressees – Ukraine, Moldova, Georgia, Azerbaijan and Armenia, as well as technical and expert cooperation with Belarus. A JV is a set of specific tools that do not guarantee the prospect of EU membership. At the same time, through this toolkit it provides an opportunity to open EU channels for the implementation of integration projects in certain countries. According to many politicians and researchers, the JV can be a useful mechanism that will accelerate the political and economic modernization of the Eastern partners [8]. Thus, since Poland's accession to the EU, relations have been filled with new content, and its role as a lawyer and lobbyist for Ukraine's European integration and Euro-Atlantic course has been strengthened. This was manifested, on the one hand, in support of Ukraine's ideas, and on the other – in the development and implementation of a specific program of EU cooperation with Eastern Europe. First of all, we are talking about the neighborhood program and especially about the Eastern Partnership project. It is the Polish–Swedish initiative aimed at real acceleration of the process of Ukraine's accession (along with other Eastern European countries) to EU integration.

Poland and Ukraine were the host countries of the UEFA Euro 2012.

Poland has been an avid supporter of Ukraine throughout the tumultuous period of the Euromaidan and the 2014 Crimean Crisis. The Polish government has campaigned for Ukraine in the European Union and is a supporter of sanctions against Russia for its actions in Ukraine. Poland has declared that they will never recognize the annexation of Crimea by Russia. In 2014, Poland's ex-foreign minister Radoslaw Sikorski alleged that in 2008, Russian President Vladimir Putin proposed to then Polish Prime Minister Donald Tusk in the division of Ukraine between Poland and Russia. Sikorski later stated that some words had been over-interpreted, and that Poland did not take part in annexations. Especially during this period, Poland took a large number of Ukrainian refugees.

2015–present

Different interpretations of bitter events regarding Poles and Ukrainians during World War II have led to a sharp  deterioration of the relations between the nations since 2015.

Historical issues regarding the Ukrainian Insurgent Army (UPA) and their massacres of Poles in Volhynia and Eastern Galicia remain a contested topic. Ukrainian memory laws (the Ukrainian decommunization laws) passed in 2015, honoring UPA, related organizations and its members, were criticized in Poland. In turn, in July 2016, the Polish Sejm passed a resolution, authored by the Law and Justice party, making July 11 a National Day of Remembrance of Victims of Genocide, noting that over 100,000 Polish citizens were massacred during a coordinated attack by the UPA. Ukrainian President Petro Poroshenko voiced regrets on the decision, arguing that it can led to "political speculation". In response, Ukrainian MP Oleksii Musii drafted a resolution declaring March 24 "Memorial Day of the Victims of Polish state genocide against Ukrainians in 1919–1951". The Marshal of the Polish Senate Stanislaw Karczewski condemned the motion.

In 2016, a special screening of the Polish film Volhynia by the Polish Institute in Kyiv for Ukrainian MPs was postponed due to concerns that it may disrupt public order, on recommendations from the Ukrainian foreign ministry.

In April 2017 the  Ukrainian Institute of National Remembrance forbade the exhumation of Polish victims of the 1943 massacres of Poles in Volhynia and Eastern Galicia as part of the broader action of halting the legalization of Polish memorial sites in Ukraine, in a retaliation for the dismantling of a monument to UPA soldiers in Hruszowice, Poland.

Polish President Andrzej Duda expressed his concerns with appointment to high Ukrainian offices of people expressing nationalistic anti-Polish views. The Ukrainian foreign ministry stated that there is no general anti-Polish sentiment in Ukraine.

In 2018, novelized Article 2a of the Polish Act on the Institute of National Remembrance, which from then on discusses the "crimes of Ukrainian nationalists and members of Ukrainian organizations collaborating with the Third German Reich", again caused criticism from the Ukrainian side.  In Ukraine, the Amendment has been called "the Anti-Banderovite Law".

In August 2019, President Volodymyr Zelenskyy promised to lift the moratorium on exhuming Polish mass graves in Ukraine after the previous Ukrainian government banned the Polish side from carrying out any exhumations of Polish victims of the UPA-perpetrated Volhynian massacres.

On 28 July 2020, Poland, Ukraine and Lithuania entered into a new international collaboration format known as the "Lublin Triangle". It was signed in the city of Lublin, Poland, by the Foreign Ministers of Poland, Ukraine and Lithuania: Jacek Czaputowicz, Dmytro Kuleba and Linas Linkevičius respectively. The Ukrainian foreign minister said that the new format "will be an important element in the development and strengthening of Central Europe, but also in strengthening Ukraine as a full member of the European and Euro-Atlantic family". The cooperation will not only concern defense issues but will also involve bolstering economic cooperation, trade, and tourism between the three countries. A joint declaration on the creation of the Lublin Triangle stressed the importance of intensifying the cooperation between the EU, NATO, and the Eastern Partnership and paying special attention to the development of the Three Seas Initiative.

In August 2021, during the COVID-19 pandemic, Poland provided Ukraine with 650,000 COVID-19 vaccines and over 129 tons of medical equipment, including oxygen concentrators, ventilators, and protective equipment. In December 2021, Poland donated further 300,000 COVID-19 vaccines to Ukraine.

In response to the Russian military buildup near Ukraine, on 31 January 2022, Poland announced the decision to supply Ukraine with weapons, ammunition, as well as humanitarian aid, given the threat of a Russian invasion of Ukraine. On 17 February 2022 the British–Polish–Ukrainian trilateral pact was announced. On 23 February 2022, in response to Russia's escalation of tensions and recognition of the separatist Donetsk People's Republic and Luhansk People's Republic in Russian-occupied eastern Ukraine, Polish President Andrzej Duda visited Kyiv along with the President of Lithuania, and they jointly declared solidarity and support for Ukraine, and called for international sanctions against Russia. On 24 February 2022, the day of the Russian invasion of Ukraine, the Sejm (Polish parliament) adopted by acclamation a resolution condemning the Russian invasion. Poland immediately set up nine reception points to receive civilian refugees from Ukraine. During the war in 2022, Poland became the second largest weapons supplier to Ukraine, with the weapons' total value exceeding $1.6 billion (as of 24 May 2022). Provided weapons include missiles, grenade launchers, rifles, drones, tanks, RPGs and ammunition. Continued Polish support for Ukraine in the early 2022 has led to significant improvement in Polish-Ukraine relations.

On June 1, 2022, the first bilateral intergovernmental consultations took place in Kyiv.

Resident diplomatic missions
 Poland has an embassy in Kyiv and consulates-general in Kharkiv, Lutsk, Lviv, Odessa and Vinnytsia.
 Ukraine has an embassy in Warsaw and consulates-general in Gdańsk, Kraków, Lublin and Wrocław.

See also
 Poland–Ukraine border
 History of Ukrainian nationality
 Khmelnytsky Uprising
 Kupala Night
 Międzymorze
 POLUKRBAT
 Polish–Ukrainian War, 1 November 1918 – 17 July 1919
 Population exchange between Poland and Soviet Ukraine
 UEFA Euro 2012
 Ukrainians in Poland 
 Poles in Ukraine
 Ukraine–EU relations 
 Accession of Ukraine to the European Union
 List of twin towns and sister cities in Poland
 List of twin towns and sister cities in Ukraine
 2022 missile explosion in Poland

References

Further reading
 R. and K. Wolczuk, Poland and Ukraine: A Strategic Partnership in a Changing Europe? Royal Institute of International Affairs, 2003.
 Iffly, Catherine, Du conflit à la coopération? Les rapprochements franco-allemand, germano-polonais et polono-ukrainien en perspective comparée (The French-German, German-Polish and Polish-Ukrainian Rapprochements in Comparative Perspective), Revue d'Allemagne, 35/4, 2003.
 Zajączkowski, Wojciech, Polish-Ukrainian Relations, Yearbook of Polish Foreign Policy (01/2005), 
 Siwiec, Marek, The Polish-Ukrainian Relations during the Last Decade, The Polish Foreign Affairs Digest (4 (5)/2002), 
 Joanna Konieczna, Poles and Ukrainians, Poland and Ukraine: The Paradoxes of Neighbourly Relations
 Kevin Hannan, review of Polska-Ukraina: 1000 lat sąsiedztwa, The Sarmatian Review, September 2004
 Copsey, N. (2006) Echoes of the Past in Contemporary Politics: the case of Polish-Ukrainian Reconciliation, SEI Working Paper, No. 87.
 Oleksandr Pavliuk, The Ukrainian-Polish Strategic Partnership and Central European Geopolitics
 Litwin Henryk, Central European Superpower, BUM Magazine, 2016.
 Дрозд Р., Гальчак Б. Історія українців у Польщі в 1921–1989 роках / Роман Дрозд, Богдан Гальчак, Ірина Мусієнко; пер. з пол. І. Мусієнко. 3-тє вид., випр., допов. – Харків : Золоті сторінки, 2013. – 272 с.
 Roman Drozd, Roman Skeczkowski, Mykoła Zymomrya: Ukraina — Polska. Kultura, wartości, zmagania duchowe. Koszalin: 1999.
 Roman Drozd, Bohdan Halczak: Dzieje Ukraińców w Polsce w latach 1921–1989». Warszawa: 2010

 
Ukraine
Poland